Carew Tower is a 49-story,  Art Deco building completed in 1930 in the heart of downtown Cincinnati, Ohio, overlooking the Ohio River waterfront. The structure is the second-tallest building in the city, and it was added to the register of National Historic Landmarks on April 19, 1994. The tower is named after Joseph T. Carew, proprietor of the Mabley & Carew department store chain, which had previously operated in a building on the site.

The complex contains the Hilton Cincinnati Netherland Plaza (formerly Omni Netherland Plaza), which is described as a fine example of Art Deco architecture. The hotel's Hall of Mirrors banquet room was inspired by the Hall of Mirrors at the Palace of Versailles.

Hilton Cincinnati Netherland Plaza is a member of Historic Hotels of America, the official program of the National Trust for Historic Preservation.

The tower remained the city's tallest until the completion of the Great American Tower at Queen City Square on July 13, 2010, rising  higher than Carew Tower.

History
The Carew Tower replaced the late nineteenth-century Carew Building, a nine-story structure built in 1891 in the Romanesque style, designed by Cincinnati architect James W. McLaughlin. The Carew Building, home to the Mabley & Carew department store, included a clock tower and hydraulic elevators. Following the death of J.T. Carew in 1914, the building was purchased by a real estate corporation founded by Cincinnati industrialist Thomas Emery. By the summer of 1929, the Carew Building had been demolished to build the new tower.

Construction began in September 1929, just one month before the stock market crash on October 24 that triggered the Great Depression. Because of this, construction was continued on a modified plan. Art Deco stylistic motifs can be found throughout the building, particularly in the metalwork and areas surrounding the elevators and lights.  Locally-made Rookwood Pottery floral tiles adorn the east and west entrances of the building. Sculpture on the exterior and interior of the building were executed by New York City architectural sculptor Rene Paul Chambellan.

Eighteen Louis Grell murals can be found throughout the Hilton Netherland Plaza Hotel on the bottom floor: 10 wall-to-ceiling murals in the hotel's original lobby, now the Palm Court; four murals in the Continental Room; two above the side entry staircase.  The staircase mural says "Welcome Travelers" and the four in the Continental Room represent the four seasons of the year. The 90-foot long Apollo Gallery includes an "Apollo on Chariot" mural and a large "Hunt of Diana" mural by Grell.  These subjects echo similar ones that appear at the Palais de Versailles. 

The total cost of the building was US$33 million ($ in  dollars). It took crews only 13 months to complete the construction, working 24 hours a day and 7 days a week.

Through the 1930s, the Netherland Plaza Hotel was run by hotel industry pioneer Ralph Hitz's National Hotel Management Company.

From 1930 until 1960, the Carew Tower was the home of the Mabley & Carew department store.

From 1967 to 1980, the Carew Tower and the neighboring Fourth and Vine Tower, then called the Central Trust Bank tower, were featured in the opening and closing credits of the daytime soap opera The Edge of Night, which used Cincinnati as the stand-in for the show's fictional locale of "Monticello". Procter & Gamble, the show's producer, is based in Cincinnati.

From 1978 to 1982, the building was featured in the opening and closing credits on the sitcom WKRP in Cincinnati.

Today, the building is home to a mixed group of tenants, including a shopping arcade, Hilton Cincinnati Netherland Plaza, and offices. Visitors can access the observation deck located on the 49th floor. On a clear day, visitors can see for miles in all directions, and three states (Kentucky, Indiana, Ohio). Because of its architectural standards, as well as its identity with the city's heritage, Carew Tower was designated a National Historic Landmark in 1994.
The observation deck is closed.

In August 2022, the building sold for $18 million (USD) to Victrix Investments LLC. The building is to undergo residential conversion.

Design 
The Carew Tower is a leading example of Art Deco architecture. It was designed by the architectural firm W.W. Ahlschlager & Associates with Delano & Aldrich and developed by John J. Emery. The original concept was a development that would include a department store, a theater, an office accommodation, and a hotel to rival the Waldorf-Astoria. Emery took on as partner with William A. Starrett (Starrett Investment Corp.) and Starrett Brothers, Inc. as general contractors. The building is widely considered to be an early prototype of an urban mixed-use development, a "city within a city". New York City's Rockefeller Center, built around the same time, is a more famous example of this concept. 

The building was originally designed with three towers: the tallest housing offices, the second the hotel, and the third serving as a parking garage which had an elevator rather than traditional ramps for access. The third parking tower was demolished in 1980 due to corrosion from road salt. There was also a turntable for vehicles to assist in pointing delivery trucks in the right direction. The system has since been dismantled.

Statistics
9 miles of brass piping
15 railroad cars full of glass
37 miles of steel piping
40 railroad cars full of stone
60 miles of floor and window molding
60 railroad cars full of lumber
4500 plumbing fixtures
5000 doors
8000 windows (upon its completion in 1931)
15000 tons of structural steel
4 million bricks in the outer structure

Gallery

See also
List of tallest buildings in Cincinnati
Chanin Building
Empire State Building

References

External links

National Historic Landmarks Program: Carew Tower-Netherland Plaza Hotel
Carew Tower & adjoining Netherlands Hotel
Carew Tower-Netherland Plaza Hotel - University of Cincinnati
 360 degree interactive panorama from the top of Carew Tower
Louis Grell Foundation
Location of Wabash-Harrison Garage(

Office buildings completed in 1930
Art Deco skyscrapers
Hilton Hotels & Resorts hotels
National Historic Landmarks in Ohio
National Register of Historic Places in Cincinnati
Skyscraper office buildings in Cincinnati
Hotels in Ohio
Art Deco hotels
Art Deco architecture in Ohio
1930 establishments in Ohio